Bela Tarr, the Time After (Béla Tarr, le temps d'après) is a 2011 non-fiction book by Jacques Rancière about the films of Bela Tarr.

References

External links

2011 non-fiction books
Non-fiction books about film directors and producers
Books by Jacques Rancière